Madope auferens, the black-dot moth, is a moth of the family Noctuidae first described by Thomas Pennington Lucas in 1898. It is known from Australia, including Queensland.

The wingspan is about 30 mm. Adults are pale brown, with a number of darker spots on each wing. The forewings each have reddish tinge along the costa.

References

Catocalinae